The Jemez Mountains (Tewa: Tsąmpiye'ip'įn,  Navajo: Dził Łizhinii) are a group of mountains in Rio Arriba, Sandoval, and Los Alamos counties, New Mexico, United States.

Numerous Puebloan Indian tribes have lived in the Jemez Mountains region for centuries before the Spanish arrived in New Mexico. The Pueblo Nations of this region are the Towa-speaking Jemez people, after whom the mountain range is named, and the Keres-speaking Zia People. 
  
The town of Los Alamos and the Los Alamos National Laboratory adjoin the eastern side of the range while the town of Jemez Springs is to the west. Pajarito Mountain Ski Area is the only ski area in the Jemez. New Mexico State Highway 4 is the primary road that provides vehicular access to locations in the Jemez Mountains.

Geology

The Jemez Mountains lie to the north of the Albuquerque Basin in the Rio Grande rift.
They are a classic example of intracontinental volcanism and consist of a broadly circular ridge surrounding the Valles Caldera. The latter is the type location for resurgent caldera eruptions.

The mountains lie on the intersection of the western margin of the Rio Grande Rift and the Jemez Lineament. Here magma produced from the fertile rock of an ancient subduction zone has repeatedly found its way to the surface along faults produced by rifting. This has produced a long-lived volcanic field, with the earliest eruptions beginning at least 13 million years ago and continuing almost to the present day. The most recent known eruption is the obsidian of the Banco Bonito flow, dated to 68.3 ± 1.5 thousand years before the present.

Most of the volume of the range is composed of pre-caldera basalts, andesites, and dacites of the Keres Group and Polvadera Group, but there are extensive outflow sheets of the Bandelier Tuff and young rhyolites associated with caldera resurgence, all assigned to the Tewa Group.

The two most recent caldera-forming eruptions, dated to about 1.62 million and 1.256 million years ago, produced massive ignimbrite deposits known as the Otowi and Tshirege members, respectively, of the Bandelier Tuff.  Much of the material in these deposits now forms the Pajarito Plateau, a scenic region of canyons and mesas on which Los Alamos is situated.  Redondo Peak, the second-highest summit in the range at 11,254 ft (3431 m), is a resurgent dome in the middle of the Valles Caldera, which also contains several smaller volcanos.  The caldera is segregated by these structures and its rim into multiple lush grass valleys (valles in Spanish, hence the name).

This zone consists of at least 10% molten rock and represents a new pulse of magmatic activity. This is monitored by the Los Alamos Seismic Network, which has detected no unusual volcano-seismic activity since it was installed in the 1970s.

Public use

Much of the range is federal land, including Santa Fe National Forest, Bandelier National Monument, and the Valles Caldera National Preserve. Hiking trails crisscross the range and lead to many of the summits, although some regions are closed to hikers either because of environmental restrictions or because they are on the territory of Santa Clara Pueblo or private landholders. (Access to pueblo lands is available by permit.) The summits are generally easy to climb (in good weather) and require no technical climbing skills, but rock climbing is popular on some of the basalt cliffs near Los Alamos, Caja del Rio and elsewhere in the range. The mountains also are home to Pajarito Mountain, a small downhill ski area and offer some opportunities for cross country skiing, although not every winter produces enough snow to support this recreational activity. The region is prone to forest fires because of the tendency for spring weather to be dry and windy, creating conditions under which fires caused by human activities or lightning can spread rapidly. The Las Conchas Fire in 2011 was the most recent large wildfire. Parts of Los Alamos National Laboratory were also damaged, although none of the laboratory's special nuclear materials were threatened or released.

Communities
Census-designated places within the Jemez Mountains include Jemez Springs and Jemez Pueblo. Jemez Springs is a small town with a population of 198 according to the 2020 census.  In the Jemez Pueblo, more than 90% of around 34,000 members speak the Towa language. Within this community, all decisions are made by the tribal government, which are heavily influenced by traditional connections to the Jemez land.

Flora 
There are over 720 plant species in the Jemez Mountain region with six community types that include, subalpine grassland, spruce-fir, mixed conifer, ponderosa pine, pinyon juniper, and juniper-grassland. Ponderosa pine are found between 2100 and 2300 meters on the east side of the Jemez Mountains while mixed conifer forests are found between 2100 and 3200 meters in elevation. Spruce-fir forests are mostly found at the summits of mountains due to suitable climate conditions.

Fauna

The Jemez Mountains house the American elk (wapiti), the golden-mantled ground squirrel, the Gunnison's prairie dog, American beavers, black bears, and mountain lions. The Jemez Mountains are also home to a federally endangered species, the Jemez Mountains salamander. This species is mostly found in mixed-conifer forests and was listed under the Endangered Species Act in 2013. The Jemez Mountains salamander's habitat is in danger due to forest fires, increased tree density, the destruction of habitat, and climate change.

References

External links

 
 Santa Fe National Forest (Forest Service site) 
  First Photo from Space identifies Jemez Mountains as "Valle Grande Mts"

 
Mountain ranges of New Mexico
Volcanoes of New Mexico
Volcanic fields of New Mexico
Landforms of Sandoval County, New Mexico
Landforms of Rio Arriba County, New Mexico
Landforms of Los Alamos County, New Mexico
Landforms of Santa Fe County, New Mexico
Volcanic groups
Pleistocene volcanism